Axess may refer to:

Axess magasin, Swedish magazine
 Axess TV, Swedish television channel
 Axess (CRS), Japanese computer reservations system 
 Axess Vision Technology, medical device manufacturing company
 ENC Axess, a transit bus marketed in North America
 Oslo Axess, Norwegian stock exchange market

See also
Access (disambiguation)
Axxess (disambiguation)
Axes (disambiguation)